Belgium sent four athletes to compete at the 2006 Winter Olympics in Turin, Italy.

Figure skating

Short track speed skating 

Key: 'ADV' indicates a skater was advanced due to being interfered with.

Speed skating

References

External links

Nations at the 2006 Winter Olympics
2006
Olympics